The Territorial Highways of Islamabad Capital Territory consists of all public highways maintained by the Pakistani territory of Islamabad Capital Territory region. These are not to be confused with National Highways, which are federal roads maintained by the Government of Pakistan and the National Highway Authority.

List of Territorial Highways

List of Territorial Roads
 3rd Avenue
 4th Avenue
 7th Avenue
 9th Avenue
 Aga Khan Road
 Atatürk Avenue
 Constitution Avenue
 Faisal Avenue
 Garden Avenue
 Ibn-e-Sina Road
 Jinnah Avenue
 Khayaban-e-Suhrwardy
 Margalla Avenue
 Murree Road
 IJP Road
Park Road

See also
 Motorways of Pakistan
 National Highways of Pakistan
 Transport in Pakistan
 National Highway Authority

References

External links 
 Capital Development Authority - Engineering Wing

Highways in Islamabad Capital Territory
Roads in Islamabad Capital Territory
Lists of roads in Pakistan